Michael Harvey may refer to:

Music
Michael Kieran Harvey (born 1961), Australian pianist
Harvey (rapper) (Michael Harvey Jr., born 1979), British rapper and former member of So Solid Crew
Mick Harvey (Michael John Harvey, born 1958), Australian musician, singer-songwriter, composer, arranger and record producer

Politics
Michael Harvey (died 1712), UK Member of Parliament for Weymouth and Melcombe Regis
Michael Harvey (died 1748), UK Member of Parliament for Milborne Port

Sports
Michel Harvey (1938–2017), Canadian former professional ice hockey player
Michael Harvey (racewalker) (born 1962), retired Australian race walker
Michael Harvey (taekwondo) (born 1989), British taekwondo athlete
M. S. Harvey (Michael Smith Harvey, 1881–1958), American football coach
Mick Harvey (umpire) (1921–2016), Australian cricketer and umpire

Other
Michael Harvey (lettering artist) (1931–2013), English lettering artist, teacher and writer
Michael C. Harvey, African American inventor
Michael Harvey, Director of the Botanic Gardens and State Herbarium in Adelaide, South Australia from July 2021 
Michael Martin Harvey (1897–1975), British actor
Michael Harvey (author), American author

See also 
 Harvey (name)